Earl of Bristol is a title that has been created twice in British history, and was attested once before. Antiquaries Carew and Williams refer to Reginald de Dunstanville (–1175, the illegitimate son of King Henry I) as Earl of Bristol. However, the first confirmed creation came in the Peerage of England in 1622 in favour of the politician and diplomat John Digby who served for many years as Ambassador to Spain, and had already been created Baron Digby of Sherborne, in the County of Dorset, in 1618, also in the Peerage of England. Digby was the brother of Sir Robert Digby of Coleshill, Warwickshire, whose son Robert Digby became 1st Baron Digby of Geashill in the Peerage of Ireland in 1620. (See the article Baron Digby for more information on this other branch of the family).

He was succeeded by his son, the second Earl. He was a prominent statesman and served as Secretary of State for King Charles I. In 1641 he was summoned to the House of Lords through a writ of acceleration in his father's junior title of Baron Digby of Sherborne. When he died the titles passed to his son, the third Earl. He sat as Member of Parliament for Dorset and served as Lord-Lieutenant of Dorset. He was childless and the titles became extinct on his death in 1698.

The second creation of the earldom came in the Peerage of Great Britain in 1714 for John Hervey. For more information on this creation, see Marquess of Bristol.

Earl of Bristol 
Reginald de Dunstanville (c. 1110–1175)

Earls of Bristol, first creation (1622)
John Digby, 1st Earl of Bristol (1586–1653)
George Digby, 2nd Earl of Bristol (1612–1677)
John Digby, 3rd Earl of Bristol (c. 1635–1698)

Earls of Bristol, second creation (1714)
see the Marquess of Bristol

References

Kidd, Charles, Williamson, David (editors). Debrett's Peerage and Baronetage (1990 edition). New York: St Martin's Press, 1990.
www.thepeerage.com

Extinct earldoms in the Peerage of England

1622 establishments in England
Noble titles created in 1622
Noble titles created in 1714
Earldoms in the Peerage of Great Britain
Digby family